A serious outbreak of foot-and-mouth disease occurred in South Korea in 2010–2011, leading to the culling of hundreds of thousands of pigs (as of January 2011) in an effort to contain it. The outbreak began in November 2010 in pig farms in Andong, Gyeongsangbuk-do, and has since spread in the country rapidly. More than 100 cases of foot-and-mouth disease have been confirmed in the country so far, and South Korean officials have started a mass cull of approximately 12 percent of the entire domestic pig population and 107,000 of three million cattle of the country to halt the outbreak.

As parts of the culling process, it was reported by some sections of the English-language media that the South Korean government had decided to bury approximately 1.4 million pigs alive, which drew complaints from animal activists. The American animal rights organization People for the Ethical Treatment of Animals started online campaigns, arguing that the animals should be vaccinated rather than buried alive.

Joyce D'Silva, Director of Public Affairs for Compassion in World Farming, said that they are "appalled", and argued that it is contrary to international guidelines on humane culling, which the South Korean government allegedly endorsed. However the local media had only reported that there had been incidents of swine being buried alive, and that a South Korean agriculture ministry official had confirmed some incidents, but that they had been few, explaining that "officials are rushed to stop the spread, and the number of people involved is too small for the operation," and that until a more humane way to cull the infected swine is found, the government will have to resort to burying the infected animals alive because the "government has temporarily run out of euthanasia drugs."

On 12 January 2011, local officials stated that more than US$1 billion worth of livestock have been lost so far to the disease, including government efforts to halt the spread. According to Kim Jae-hong, a veterinary science professor at Seoul National University, the outbreak is "the most serious in Korea's history" and it is difficult to say when the spread of the disease will be stopped, and he said that "the most important thing right now is to control movement in and out of the farmhouses that are affected, and thoroughly disinfect the cars around the area".

South Korea's Citizens' Institute for Environmental Studies revealed 32 places that had dead livestocks buried around 4 drinking water facilities in Gyeonggi-do.

A ProMED-mail post described the epizootic and subsequent cancellations of festivities as being reminiscent of Britain's February 19, 2001 foot-and-mouth disease outbreak, and even more so of an outbreak in Japan beginning late March 2010, which was caused by the same strain of the virus.  In that epizootic cattle herds were found to be 3.9-4.5 times more susceptible to the virus than pig herds, but pig herds had 5.0-13.6 times greater relative infectiousness; thus cattle on infected premises suffered a cumulative incidence of 8.5%, whereas 36.4% of pigs were infected.

References

2010 disasters in South Korea
2011 disasters in South Korea
Agriculture in South Korea
2010 disease outbreaks
2011 disease outbreaks
Lee Myung-bak Government
Foot-and-mouth outbreaks
Disease outbreaks in South Korea
Animal cruelty incidents
Filmed deaths of animals